1979 Challenge Cup may refer to:

1979 Challenge Cup (ice hockey), a series of international ice hockey games between the Soviet Union national ice hockey team and a team of All-Stars from the National Hockey League.
1979 Challenge Cup (rugby league), the 78th staging of the Northern Rugby Football League's knockout competition.